The Emigrants is a 1977 Australian-British mini series about an English family who move to Australia.

Cast
 Penne Hackforth-Jones as June Parker
 Brian Deacon as Michael Parker
Joe Ritchie as William Parker, Sr.
 Michael Craig as Bill Parker
 Sheila Reid as May Parker
 Simon Gipps-Kent as Paul Parker
 Lesley Manville as Janice Parker
Lance Stewart as Dave

References

External links

1977 television films
1977 films
BBC television dramas
1970s Australian television miniseries
1977 Australian television series debuts
1977 Australian television series endings
1970s British television miniseries
1977 British television series debuts
1977 British television series endings